Albert Kaltschmidt was a German immigrant who became a wealthy industrialist in the United States. During World War I he was the leader of a pro-German Empire group. This lone wolf group (Independent of Imperial Germany's Spy network) was able to bomb a Canadian factory in 1915. He was arrested for an attempt to bomb Detroit factories, and was convicted of Conspiracy in 1917.

Business career

In Detroit he became the President of the Marine City Salt company. He was also elected secretary of the local Deutcherbund.

WWI
In May 1915 he called a meeting of fellow pro-Germans including Walter Scholz, Charles F. Respa, and his brother-in-law Carl Schmidt. There he told those assembled that it was their duty to the Fatherland to sabotage munition production that was being sent to Allied nations fighting the Central Powers.  On June 21, 1915, Kaltschmidt was able to connect gave Charles F. Respa 156 sticks of dynamite and introduced him to a night watchman, William Lefler, who was employed as security at the Peabody Overall Co factory in Walkerville, Ontario. 

On June 21, 1915, Respa was able to bomb the Peabody factory, but a bomb placed at the Windsor Armoury failed to explode, saving the lives of 200 soldiers who were stationed there. On March 7, 1916, Respa was sentenced to life imprisonment. In 1917, ring leader and President of the Marine City Salt company, Albert Kaltschmidt, faced charges in America for attempting to bomb the Detroit Screw Works. Others charged were William M. Jarosh, Richard Herman, and Fritz A. Neef, general manager of the Eismann Magneto company.

Sentencing of Kaltschmidt and his Co-conspiracists
Detroit Judge Arthur J. Tuttle sentenced Albert Kaltschmidt to four years in Leavenworth, and $20,000 fine ($ in ). His Co-conspiracists were also sentenced to:
Fritz Neef, two years in Leavenworth, and $10,000 fine.
Ida Kaltschmidt Neff, three years in Detroit house of correction, and $15,000 fine.
Carl Schmidt, two years in Leavenworth, and $10,000 fine.
Mary Schmidt, two years in Detroit house of correction, and $10,000 fine.
Frank Franz Respa was acquitted.

See also

Terrorism in the United States
List of German sponsored acts of terrorism during WWI

Bibliography 
Notes

References 

 

 - Total pages: 229
 - Total pages: 692
 - Total pages: 95

1871 births
20th-century deaths

Year of death missing
1915 crimes in the United States 
American spies for Imperial Germany
Bombers (people) 
Failed assassins
German emigrants to the United States 
Terrorist incidents in the United States in the 1910s
World War I spies for Germany